Özpınar is a village in the Şirvan District of Siirt Province in Turkey. The village is populated by Kurds of the Mehmediyan tribe and had a population of 338 in 2021.

References 

Kurdish settlements in Siirt Province
Villages in Şirvan District